Theropithecus brumpti was a large terrestrial monkey that lived in the mid to late Pliocene. It is an extinct species of papionin.

This fossil primate is mostly known from skulls and mandibles found in Pliocene deposits excavated in the Shungura Formation, at the Omo River, Ethiopia. Both T. brumpti, and its cousin, the extant gelada (T. gelada), were related to the baboon.

Description
 
Similar to most other such animals, T. brumpti was quadrupedal with highly dexterous, manipulative hands. Males grew very large, as evidenced by a specimen found at Lomekwi, Kenya, which was estimated to have weighed approximately 43.8 kilograms. (In comparison, the male gelada averages around 20 kilograms ). In addition, the male was most likely very colorful, with the female smaller and less colorful; the species displayed a high degree of sexual dimorphism. Like most papionins, the male possessed large canine teeth, primarily for display.

Diet
Theropithecus brumpti was most likely a folivore. Large muscles in the long muzzle suggest T. brumpti ate tough vegetation, and was capable of breaking and eating large nuts.

Habitat
This species was largely terrestrial, with the size of adult males making any significant arboreal lifestyle unlikely. From the locations of T. brumpti finds, the species lived in riverine forest habitats.

References

Pliocene primates
Prehistoric monkeys
Papionini
Pliocene mammals of Africa
Fossil taxa described in 1947